Allium sindjarense is a species of flowering plant in the Amaryllidaceae family.

is a Middle Eastern species of wild onion found in Iraq, Kuwait, Lebanon, Palestine, Saudi Arabia, Syria and Turkey. It is a bulb-forming perennial with an umbel if very tiny white flowers on elongated pedicels.

References

sindjarense
Onions
Plants described in 1875
Taxa named by Eduard August von Regel
Taxa named by Heinrich Carl Haussknecht
Taxa named by Pierre Edmond Boissier
Flora of Iraq
Flora of Kuwait
Flora of Lebanon
Flora of Palestine (region)
Flora of Saudi Arabia
Flora of Syria
Flora of Turkey